Bedwellty was a county constituency in Monmouthshire which returned one Member of Parliament (MP)  to the House of Commons of the Parliament of the United Kingdom from 1918 until it was abolished for the 1983 general election.

It was then largely replaced by the new Islwyn constituency.

Boundaries 
On its creation in 1918 the constituency consisted of the urban districts of Bedwas and Machen, Bedwellty, Mynyddislwyn and Risca and the civil parish of Rogerstone in St Mellons Rural District. These areas had previously been divided between the West Monmouthshire and South Monmouthshire constituencies.

The House of Commons (Redistribution of Seats) Act 1949 removed Rogerstone into the constituency of Monmouth from 1950. Although there were substantial changes in local government boundaries in 1974, those of the constituency were not altered prior to its abolition in 1983.

The constituency was abolished by the Parliamentary Constituencies (Wales) Order 1983, which redistributed Commons seats and aligned boundaries with wards of the districts created by the Local Government Act 1972.

Members of Parliament

Election results

Elections in the 1910s

Elections in the 1920s

Elections in the 1930s

Election in the 1940s

Elections in the 1950s

Elections in the 1960s

Elections in the 1970s

References 

History of Monmouthshire
Historic parliamentary constituencies in South Wales
Constituencies of the Parliament of the United Kingdom established in 1918
Constituencies of the Parliament of the United Kingdom disestablished in 1983
Politics of Monmouthshire